Bobby Bryant may refer to:

 Bobby Bryant (musician) (1934–1998), American jazz trumpeter
 Bobby Bryant (born 1944), American football player
 Bobby Lynn Bryant (born 1992), American boxer

See also
Bob Bryant (disambiguation)
Robert Bryant (disambiguation)